The Experimental High School Attached to Beijing Normal University (commonly abbreviated as The Experimental High School Attached to BNU or Experimental High and sometimes referred to as ESBNU or SDSZ, is a beacon high school in Xicheng District, Beijing, China established in 1917. It is composed of a junior high school, encompassing grades 7 through 9, and a senior high school, encompassing grades 10 through 12. It is an experimental base for teaching reform considered by the Chinese Ministry of Education and Beijing Normal University.

The school is well known for its core values and academic excellence, as well as for the torture and murder of Bian Zhongyun, a deputy principal at the school and one of the first victims of the Cultural Revolution.

History
In March 1917, the Girls' Middle School Attached to Beijing Girls' Normal School was established.

In July 1924, the Girls' Middle School became subordinated to the newly established Girls' Normal University.

In July 1931, Girls' Normal University and Beijing Normal University integrated. At the time of this joining, the School's name changed to Girls' Middle School Attached to Beijing Normal University.

The Party branch and general Party branch were successively founded in Girls' Middle School Attached to Beijing Normal University in July 1945 and August 1946.

In 1949 and 1952, Girl Student's Section of North China YuCai Middle School, Private Wen Hua Girls Middle School and North China Middle School were successively integrated into the school. The school was then moved to No.14, Erlong Road, Xicheng District.

In September 1955, the name of the school was changed to Beijing Experimental High School by the Ministry of Education. The event was commemorated by Guo Moruo, a famous writer, who wrote the new name of the school in calligraphy.

In 1956, the school was classified as a key school of Beijing.

In March 1957, Chairman Mao Zedong made remarks on the diary of "working back in the countryside" written by Wang Guiqin, a student from the school.

In April 1960, Liu Shaoqi wrote a few words of encouragement for a class called "Studying for Revolution", which was offered to second-year students.

In 1961, the school pioneered teaching reform of five-year middle school (three years for junior middle school and two years for senior middle school) nationwide under the leadership of Central Publicity Department and Ministry of Education.

In August 1964, the school returned to the administration of Beijing Normal University and resumed the former name the Girls' Middle School Attached to Beijing Normal University.

On August 5, 1966, Bian Zhongyun,  the school's deputy principal, was tortured and beaten to death by her students, led by Song Binbin. She was the first fatality of the Cultural Revolution. Witnesses said she was tortured all day, while her students shaved her head, poured ink on her head, jabbed her head with scissors, beat her until her eyes rolled into her head, and laughed as she foamed at the mouth. In 2007 the school published a picture book of famous alumni featuring Bian and Song on opposing pages. The publication led to widespread anger and scorn among victims of Mao-era violence.

In 1968, male students were permitted admission, marking an end to the 50-year history of female-only admission.

In 1972, the school was renamed Beijing No.150 Middle School, under the administration of the Xicheng District of Beijing.

In 1978, the school became subordinated to Beijing Normal University with the present name the Experimental High School Attached to Beijing Normal University, and regained the title of Beijing municipal top school, with students enrolled citywide on the basis of competitive selection.

In 1980, the school initiated a selective course dealing with computer science nationwide.

In 1982, during the 65th anniversary celebration, the school received various encouraging inscriptions from the central government leader Chen Yun, Beijing municipal government leaders as well as other well-known celebrities, such as Zhou Peiyuan, Ye Shengtao, Hua Luogeng.

In 1983, the school was determined by the Ministry of Education as an experimental field in implementing course outlines for Middle School Moral Education, and initiated related research and experiments nationwide.

In 1984, the school pioneered nationwide curriculum reform on the basis of curricular teaching and combining curricular and extracurricular activities.

In 1986, the school conducted experiments regarding the implementation of Middle School Civics Education Reform, a key research topic of the state's Seventh Five-Year Plan.

In 1989, the middle school Chinese textbooks compiled by the school teachers since 1978 were approved by the Ministry of Education as experimental textbooks nationwide. In 1992, (approved by the Ministry of Education) these textbooks were spread nationwide as trial editions for middle schools in implementing nine-year compulsory education, and are now widely used in Beijing.

In 1991, the high school Chinese textbooks, compiled by school teachers and used as trial editions school-wide, were approved by the Ministry of Education to be officially published.

In 1992, Premier of State Council Li Peng and Director of the Central Advisory Committee Chen Yun wrote inscriptions for the 75th anniversary celebration.

In 1993, the school defined its mission statement.

In 1994, the school was classified by the Beijing Educational Bureau as a model school of all-around education with unique schooling characteristics. Approved by Beijing Education Commission, the school became one of the two privileged schools to organize its own exit exams for graduating seniors.

In 1995, the school was classified as an advanced school in research of educational science.

In 1995, the school was evaluated as a model school in promotion of public health. It was awarded the bronze medal in 1996, the silver medal in 1997 and the gold medal in 2000.

In March 1997, Al Gore (the former vice-president of the United States of America) paid a visit to the school, and discussed the implementation of his GLOBE Program with students.

In the same month, the school, along with the Educational Department of Brunswick Province and the Canadian government, founded the Beijing Concord College of Sino-Canada.

In 1997, on the 80th anniversary, Chinese President and General Secretary of the Communist Party Jiang Zemin and Vice-premier Li Lanqing wrote inscriptions for the school.

In 1998, the school was classified by the Ministry of Education as an experimental school in implementing modern educational technology among national primary and middle schools.

In November 1999, Nane Annan, the wife of Mr. Kofi Annan, the 7th Secretary General of the United Nations visited the school.

In August 2000, Beijing Experimental Jin Hui Network Tech Company Limited, co-run by Hong Kong Gao Yang Corporation and the school, was formally established.

In December 2000, the school passed the evaluation of the first six Beijing-based model high schools, and was highly praised by education experts.

Academics 
"Pursuing development, pursuing excellence" is the educational motto of the school. 100% of the graduating class go to college, 26% percent of which go to the top two Chinese Universities: Peking University and Tsinghua University.

The school has an International Department in its high school division for students who wish to study abroad in college. The Department offers Advanced Placement classes, as well as SAT preparation classes. In addition, students may choose from a wide range of electives, including courses about traditional Chinese medicine, "The Dream of the Red Chamber", and multivariable calculus. In recent years, graduates of the department have been accepted to Harvard, Yale, Princeton, Columbia, the University of Chicago, Rice University, Swarthmore, Pomona, UC Berkeley etc. Even though most students end up studying the US, a few choose to go to other countries such as Japan, England, and Canada.

All the teaching staff have met the state academic requirements. Young and middle-aged teachers occupy 63.2% of the staff. Over thirty teachers are city or district head-teachers in their subjects and some are heads of associations in their fields. In recent years, they have been involved in seven educational research projects at State or Education Ministry levels, and over a hundred research works have been published. Hundreds of these have been published in the state and city magazines. Many of these have received top awards in the district. In 2000, the school was evaluated as "the Advanced School in Research of Educational Science."

Motto
The school motto is "Honesty; Strictness; Truth-seeking; Pioneering".

Faculty
Principal and Deputy Secretary of the Party: Li Xiao-hui
Secretary-general of the Party and Vice Principal: Chen Guo-Cai
Deputy Secretary of the Party and Chairman of Labour Union: Teng Shu-Ling
Vice Principal: Yang Wen-Zhi
Vice Principal: Shang Jian-Jun
Vice Principal: Liu Hai-Xia
Vice Principal: Zhang Yi-Liang
Vice Principal: Hao Zhi-Yong
Assistant Principal: Liu Xue-Dong

The school employs about 300 faculty members, of which seven are national level education experts, 98 are senior teachers, and 107 are Masters or PhD graduates.

See also
Beacon high schools in Beijing
List of schools in Xicheng District
The Second High School Attached to Beijing Normal University
Red Guards

References

External links

 Official website (Chinese)
 Official website (English)

Educational institutions established in 1917
High schools in Beijing
Schools in Xicheng District
1917 establishments in China